Dr. Om Prakash Pandey (also sometimes spelled as Om Prakash Pande), is a poet who won the Sahitya Akademi Award for Sanskrit in 2008.

He is a professor and head of the Sanskrit department at Lucknow University and has been visiting professor at Sorbonne Nouvelle University in Paris, and has also been visiting faculty in universities at Utrecht in the Netherlands, Torino in Italy, and Germany. Based on his experiences in France, he wrote a Sanskrit work Rasapriya Paris Rajadhani, published by Bharatiya Vidya Bhavan.

He is also affiliated to Maharishi Sandipani Rashtriya Veda Vidya Prasthistan, Ujjain, and was appointed by the government on a task force to document and preserve Vedic chanting forms, under UNESCO’s World (intangible) Heritage Preservation programme. They were inscribed on the UNESCO Intangible Cultural Heritage Lists in 2008. He has written a book on the Rudradhyaya of the Shankayana Shakha (branch) of the Rgveda.

In 2006 he was the victim of an assault by a student union leader demanding admission. He is from Ujjain, Madhya Pradesh, and has been writing since 1977.

Works
 Vaidik Sahitya aur Samskriti ka swarup (in Hindi). Vishwa Prakashan (A unit of Wylie Eastern) 1994, New Delhi, 
 Rasapriya Paris Rajadhani (in Sanskrit). Bharatiya Vidya Bhavan.
 Rgvediya-Shankayana Rudradhyaya. Indira Gandhi National Centre for the Arts, 2009. 
 Sarva-Veda-Rudradhyaya Sangraha. 2006. .
 Jivanaparvanatakam: Hariscandropakhyanadhrtammaulikam Samskrta-natakam (Sanskrit play on Harishchandra). Penman Publishers, 1998. 
 Vaishnav Aagam Ke Vaidik Aadhaar (in Hindi). 2005. 
 Drashtavya Jagat Ka Yatharth (in Hindi). Prabhat Prakashan. .
 Atharvavediya Parishist Granthon Ka Parisheelan (with Smt. Dr. Anjul Dubey) Nag Publishers, 2005. .
 Romance with Sanskrit - Sanskrit Subodha, Chowkhamba Sanskrit Series (C.S.St. 128).
 Rasapriyaa Vibhaavanam. Nag Publishers, 2005. .
 Sadukti-karṇāmṛtam: with Hindi commentary, Chowkhamba Sanskrit Series Office, 2005.
 Ambika Dutt Vyas (Modern Sanskrit writer), Makers of Indian Literature series, 1993. 

Articles
 The other tradition of Sanskrit poetry: with special reference to the Saduktikarṇāmṛta in: Bulletin d'études indiennes 15, 1997, pp. 205–211
 Vedic Poetry: Experience at Multiple Levels. In Conversation: Prof. T. N. Dharmadhikari, Prof. G. C. Tripathi, and Prof. Om Prakash Pandey with Sudha Gopalakrishnan, in the September 2006 Issue of Kriti-Rakshana, the bi-monthly publication of the National Mission for Manuscripts

References

Living people
Recipients of the Sahitya Akademi Award in Sanskrit
Academic staff of the University of Lucknow
Sanskrit poets
Year of birth missing (living people)